Plaza del Sol is one of the largest shopping malls in the urban area of Guadalajara, Jalisco, Mexico, located in the municipality of Zapopan. Built at the end of the sixties by the architect Alejandro Zohn, it was the first mall in Latin America. It is the largest outdoor mall in the city, located next to the Plaza Milenium and future Torrena.

It is located a few blocks away from the Expo Guadalajara and the Guadalajara World Trade Center on one of the highest commercial areas of the city and rivals in importance with La Gran Plaza, Plaza Pabellón, Centro Magno and Galerías Guadalajara. Its tag line: "Plaza del Sol: todo" ("Plaza del Sol: everything") is one of the most prominent branding mechanisms in Guadalajara today.

See also
List of leading shopping streets and districts by city

External links
 todoplazadelsol.com 

Shopping malls in Guadalajara
Tourist attractions in Guadalajara, Jalisco
Zapopan